Streptomyces candidus is a bacterium species from the genus of Streptomyces which has been isolated from soil in Russia. Streptomyces candidus produces lemonomycin, enterocin, pyrazofurin and avoparcin.

See also 
 List of Streptomyces species

References

Further reading

External links
Type strain of Streptomyces candidus at BacDive – the Bacterial Diversity Metadatabase

candidus
Bacteria described in 1986